Halistemma is a genus of cnidarians belonging to the family Agalmatidae.

The genus has almost cosmopolitan distribution.

Species:

Halistemma cupulifera 
Halistemma foliacea 
Halistemma maculatum 
Halistemma rubrum 
Halistemma striata 
Halistemma transliratum

References

Agalmatidae
Hydrozoan genera